Robert Peel (1788–1850) was twice Prime Minister of the United Kingdom.

Robert Peel may also refer to:

 Robert Francis Peel (1874–1924), Governor of Saint Helena
 Robert Peel (historian) (1909–1992), American author of first scholarly biography of Mary Baker Eddy
 Robert Peel (doctor) (c. 1830–1894), medical practitioner in South Australia
 Robert Peel Dawson (1818–1877), Irish Member of Parliament
 Parsley Peel (Robert Peel, 1723–1795), English industrialist
 Sir Robert Peel, 1st Baronet (1750–1830), English politician and industrialist
 Sir Robert Peel, 3rd Baronet (1822–1895), British politician
 Robert Peel (hotelier), founder of Peel Hotels
 Bobby Peel (1857–1941), 19th century Yorkshire and England cricketer

Places
 Robert Peel Inlet, Nunavut, Canada

Other
 Sir Robert Peel, racehorse that won the first Irish Grand National in 1870
 Robert Peele (engineer) (1858–1942), American mining engineer